Long-billed lark refers to:

 any of five species of long-billed lark in southern Africa, 
 formerly the large-billed lark of South Africa and Lesotho

In part it also referred to:
 Somali lark of the Horn of Africa 
 Spike-heeled lark of southern Africa

See also
 Hoopoe larks